Jefman Airport  was an airport in North Salawati, Raja Ampat Regency, Southwest Papua, Indonesia, closed when the new Sorong Airport became operational.

References

External links
 Jefman Airport Information

Airports in Southwest Papua